John S. Brown was an American politician from Maryland. He served as a member of the Maryland House of Delegates, representing Harford County in 1868.

Career
Brown was a Democrat. He served as a member of the Maryland House of Delegates, representing Harford County in 1868.

In 1868, Brown was elected as board supervising inspector of steamboats in Baltimore.

Personal life
Brown married Elizabeth A. She died in 1870. He had at least one daughter, Elizabeth (married Daniel H. Parrish).

References

Year of birth unknown
Year of death unknown
People from Harford County, Maryland
Democratic Party members of the Maryland House of Delegates
19th-century American politicians